Zimbabwe is host to some of the oldest newspapers in Africa; The Herald, Zimbabwe's major newspaper, replaced the Mashonaland and Zambesian Times, which was present from the late 1890s. The Herald has seen a decline in readership from 132,000 to between 50,000 and 100,000 in recent years. The influential Daily News, which regularly published criticism of the government, was shut down in 2002, however its director Wilf Mbanga started The Zimbabwean soon after to continue challenging the Mugabe regime. The first daily independent Zimbabwean daily newspaper, following Daily News, NewsDay, started publishing in 2010. Journalists can be fired by the Ministry of Information if content is deemed inappropriate. Other notable Zimbabwean newspapers in print include The Chronicle, The Financial Gazette, the Zimbabwe Independent, and the Zimbabwe Daily News.

Daily newspapers

Defunct newspapers 

British South Africa Company Government Gazette (1894–1923)
The Central African Examiner (1957–1965)
Evening Standard (until 1962), merged into The Herald
The Gatooma Mail
The Gweru Times (1895–2015)
Mashonaland Herald and Zambesian Times (1891–1892), succeeded by The Rhodesia Herald
 Masvingo Star (ceased publication 2015)
The National Observer
The Northern Optimist (1894–1895), succeeded by The Gweru Times
 Pungwe News (ceased publication 2015)
 Rhodesian Advertiser

See also 

 Media of Zimbabwe

References 

Newspapers published in Zimbabwe